Tanzania Breweries Limited, also referred to as TBL, is the oldest and largest brewing company in Tanzania.

Overview
Tanzania Breweries Limited is a Tanzania based company principally engaged in the production, distribution and sale of malt beer, non-alcoholic malt beverages and alcoholic fruit beverages in Tanzania.

TBL's headquarters are located in Dar es Salaam, Tanzania it operates four breweries in Dar es Salaam, Arusha, Mwanza and Mbeya. TBL is listed on the Dar es Salaam Stock Exchange.

History

1930 - 1959 
Tanzania Breweries Limited was founded in 1933 as Tanganyika Breweries in Tanganyika (now part of Tanzania). Tanganyika Breweries was acquired by Nairobi based Kenya Breweries Limited (KBL) in 1935. In 1936, KBL and Tanganyika Breweries operations were merged leading to the creation of the East African Breweries Limited (EABL).

1960 - 1989 
In 1964, The company name was changed from Tanganyika Breweries Limited to Tanzania Breweries Limited following the political unification of Tanganyika and the People's Republic of Zanzibar and Pemba to form the United Republic of Tanzania.

In 1967 the Government of Tanzania made their first equity investment in TBL through their acquisition of 45% stake in the brewery. They later took full control of the company in 1979 as part of the government's nationalization of large industries as part of the Arusha Declaration. After being nationalized in 1967, TBL was poorly managed and become a loss making entity.

1990 - 1999 
In 1993 the Tanzanian government entered into a joint venture with South African Breweries International (Now SABMiller) to run TBL. This was through a US$22.5 million investment in TBL by SABI, giving them SABI 50% ownership of the Company. SABMiller is the second largest and one of the most efficient brewing companies in the world. SABMiller turned TBL around with extraordinary speed, almost tripling production in the space of three years.

September 9, 1998, TBL was listed on the DSE through a successful IPO. This made it the second listing on the bourse since its formation.

2000 - 2009 
In 2002, Diageo backed EABL acquired a 20% equity stake in TBL after it (EABL) signed license agreements with South African Breweries International and agreed to issue SABI a similar share Kenya Breweries Limited. In the agreement, SABI exited the Kenyan market while EABL exited the Tanzanian market by handing over its Kibo subsidiary to TBL.  This partnership gave TBL 98% share of the market as by the year 2004.

2010 to Date 
In 2010, EABL ended this agreement with TBL with the option to buy a 51% stake in Serengeti Breweries, the second-biggest beer maker in Tanzania, and disposed its 20% stake in TBL for US$71.5 million through a secondary offer on the DSE in 2011.

On March 14, 2013, the TBL acquired 60% of the share capital of Dar es Salaam based Darbrew Limited for TSh 8,816 million and obtained control of the company.

As at March 31, 2013, TBL had a 74% market share of alcoholic beverages in Tanzania and was a major exporter of beer to Nile Breweries Limited of Uganda, Crown Beverage Limited of Kenya and Zambia Breweries Limited of Zambia all subsidiaries of SABMiller.

Subsidiaries and Investments 
The companies that comprise the Tanzania Breweries Limited include:
 Tanzania Breweries Limited - The flagship company of the group. Engages in the production, distribution and sale of malt beer, non-alcoholic malt beverages and alcoholic fruit beverages in Tanzania.
 Kibo Breweries Limited - 100% Shareholding -  Engages in management of fixed assets. The companies within the group lease plant and machinery, motor vehicles and furniture from this unit.
 Tanzania Distilleries Limited - 65% Shareholding -  Engages in the production of spirituous liquors. 
 Darbrew Limited - 60% Shareholding - Engages in the production of Traditional African everages (TAB) commonly known as Opaque beer.
 Mountainside Farms Limited - 4% Shareholding - Engages in barley farming
All the companies that constitute TBL are domiciled in Tanzania.

Brands
At the moment TBL trades 11 Key brands including the following list:
 Castle Lager 
 Castle Lite
 Kilimanjaro Lager
 Eagle
 Balimi
 Ndovu Special Malt
 Safari Lager
 Castle Milk Stout
 Grand Malta
Bia Bingwa
Safari Sparkling Water
Konyagi

Ownership
The shares of Tanzania Breweries Limited are traded on the Dar es Salaam Stock Exchange, under the symbol: TBL. The shareholding in the company's stock as at March 31, 2013 was as depicted in the table below:

Governance
Tanzania Breweries Limited is governed by a ten-person Board of Directors with Leonard Mususa serving as the Chairman of the group and Philip Redman as the Managing Director.

External links
 SABMiller Homepage
 EABL Homepage
 Dar es Salaam Stock Exchange

See also
 Beer in Tanzania
 Dar es Salaam Stock Exchange
 SABMiller
 East African Breweries
 Diageo

References

SABMiller
Economic history of Tanzania
Companies listed on the Dar es Salaam Stock Exchange
Breweries of Africa
Food and drink companies established in 1933
1933 establishments in Tanganyika
Beer in Tanzania
Tanzanian brands
Manufacturing companies of Tanzania
Economy of Dar es Salaam